HD 33564 is a single star with an exoplanetary companion in the northern constellation of Camelopardalis. It has an apparent visual magnitude of 5.08, which means it is a 5th magnitude star that is faintly visible to the naked eye. The system is located at a distance of 68 light years from the Sun based on parallax, and it is drifting closer with a radial velocity of −11 km/s. It is a candidate member of the Ursa Major Moving Group.

This is an ordinary F-type main-sequence star with a stellar classification of F7V, indicating that the star is hotter and more massive than the Sun, giving it a yellow-white hue. The star is about two billion years old and is chromospherically quiet, with a projected rotational velocity of 14.3 km/s. It has about 1.5 times the radius and 1.3 times the mass of the Sun. The star is radiating 3.4 times the luminosity of the Sun from its photosphere at an effective temperature of 6,396 K.

Planetary system 
In September 2005, a massive planet was found on an eccentric orbit about the star, based on radial velocity variations measured by the ELODIE spectrograph. An infrared excess had been detected at a wavelength of 60 μm, suggesting the star may host a circumstellar disk. However, the existence of a disk is unlikely because the infrared radiation is coming from a background galaxy.

See also 
 List of extrasolar planets

References

External links 
 
 HR%201686 HR 1686
 obswww.unige.ch
 CCDM J05227+7913
 Image HD 33564

F-type main-sequence stars
Planetary systems with one confirmed planet

Camelopardalis (constellation)
Durchmusterung objects
0196
033564
025110
1686